Gidding is a surname. Notable people with the surname include:

Charles Gidding (1853–1943), United States Navy sailor
John Gidding (born 1977), American architect, actor and model

See also
Great Gidding, village in Cambridgeshire, England
Little Gidding, village in Cambridgeshire, England
Giddings (disambiguation)